Gap is an unincorporated community in Stokes County, North Carolina, United States, approximately 5 miles WSW of Danbury, North Carolina, near Hanging Rock State Park, on North Carolina State Highway 66.

Unincorporated communities in Stokes County, North Carolina
Unincorporated communities in North Carolina